Megha Ganne (born 2003 or 2004) is an American amateur golfer. In June 2021, as a 17-year-old high school student, Ganne qualified for the U.S. Women's Open. At the tournament she held a share of the lead after the opening round, and was tied for third going into the final round; she finished as the leading amateur, in a tie for 14th place. Since the age of twelve, she has been competing in golf tournaments. Her parents are from India. She has been coached for nine years by Katie Rudolph.

Amateur wins
 2017 New Jersey Junior PGA Championship
 2018 AJGA Championship
 2021 Scott Robertson Memorial

Source:

U.S. national team appearances
Junior Solheim Cup: 2021
Curtis Cup: 2022 (winners)

References

American female golfers
Amateur golfers
Golfers from New Jersey
People from Holmdel Township, New Jersey
American sportspeople of Indian descent
2000s births
Living people